The siege of Edessa took place in 163 when the Parthian Empire, under Vologases IV, besieged the city of Edessa, held by the Roman Empire. 

The Parthians captured Edessa and installed Wa'el (son of Sahru) as puppet king. Ma'nu VIII (son of Ma'nu VII), the legitimate king, was forced to flee to the Romans.

Wa'el would rule Edessa/Osroene as a Parthian subject from 163 to 165, when the Romans regained possession of the city and reinstalled Ma'nu VIII on the throne. During his short tenure, Wa'el issued coins with the portrait of the Parthian king.

References

Sources
 
 
 

Edessa
Roman–Parthian Wars
Edessa
Osroene
Edessa
Edessa
2nd century in Iran
160s in the Roman Empire